Gene Watson is an American country music artist. His discography consists of 33 studio albums, eight compilation albums, 61 singles, and five music videos. Of his singles, 48 charted on the U.S. Billboard Hot Country Songs charts between 1975 and 1997, including the 1982 number one single "Fourteen Carat Mind".

Albums

Studio albums

1960s–1980s

1990s–2020s

Compilation albums

Singles

1970s–1980s

1990s–2000s

Music videos

References

Country music discographies
Discographies of American artists